Vladimir "Lado" Dvalishvili (born 20 April 1986 in Tbilisi) is a Georgian former footballer who now works for Dinamo Batumi as their Sport Director.

Career
Dvalishvili was signed by Olimpi Rustavi in June 2006.

On 7 July 2009, Dvalishvili signed a two-year contract with the Israeli champions Maccabi Haifa.

Dvalishvili made his debut on 2009–10 UEFA Champions League Second qualifying round, 15 July 2009, against Glentoran and scored two goals.
In the next round, against Aktobe, Dvalishvili scored the last two goals in Maccabi Haifa's great comeback – scoring four straight goals after falling down 3–0 in the first 15 minutes of the match.

In January 2012, Dvalishvili joined Polish club Polonia Warsaw in the Ekstraklasa on a two-and-a-half-year contract.

Dvalishvili joined Legia Warsaw on 15 February 2013 on a two-and-a-half-year contract. The club finished the 2012–13 season with the double (cup and championship).

On 12 August 2014, "Lado" left Legia under mutual agreement and, a day later, he signed a two-year contract with Odense BK. On 27 August 2015 29-year-old Dvalishvili signed 3-year contract with Pogon.

In July 2016 Dvalishvili returned to Georgia, after agreeing to a half-year contract with FC Dinamo Tbilisi.

International career
He made his Georgia debut on 6 June 2009.
On 14 October 2009 he scored a goal against Bulgaria, in a 2010 FIFA World Cup qualifiers 6–2 defeat.
On 9 September 2009 Dvalishvili scored a goal in a friendly match his country lost 2–1 to Iceland.
On 10 October 2009 he scored a goal against Montenegro, in the 2010 FIFA World Cup qualifiers.

Career statistics
Updated 1 August 2014

International goals 
Scores and results list Georgia's goal tally first.

Honours
 Dinamo Tbilisi
 Georgian Premier League (1): 2004–05
 Georgian Super Cup (1): 2005, Runner-up (1): 2007

 Olimpi Rustavi
 Georgian Premier League: 2006–07

 Maccabi Haifa
 Israeli Premier League: 2010–11, Runner-up (1): 2009–10
 Israeli Football Cup Runner-up (1): 2010–11

 Legia Warsaw
 Polish championship (Ekstraklasa) (2): 2012–13, 2013–14
 Polish Cup (1): 2012–13
 Polish SuperCup Runner-up (1): 2014–15

References

External links
 
 
 
 

1986 births
Living people
Footballers from Georgia (country)
Georgia (country) under-21 international footballers
Georgia (country) international footballers
Expatriate footballers from Georgia (country)
Footballers from Tbilisi
FC Dinamo Tbilisi players
FC Dinamo Batumi players
FC Metalurgi Rustavi players
Skonto FC players
Maccabi Haifa F.C. players
Polonia Warsaw players
Legia Warsaw players
Pogoń Szczecin players
Odense Boldklub players
FC Atyrau players
Hapoel Ashkelon F.C. players
FC Saburtalo Tbilisi players
Erovnuli Liga players
Israeli Premier League players
Ekstraklasa players
Expatriate footballers in Latvia
Expatriate footballers in Israel
Expatriate footballers in Poland
Expatriate men's footballers in Denmark
Expatriate footballers in Kazakhstan
Expatriate sportspeople from Georgia (country) in Latvia
Expatriate sportspeople from Georgia (country) in Israel
Expatriate sportspeople from Georgia (country) in Poland
Expatriate sportspeople from Georgia (country) in Denmark
Expatriate sportspeople from Georgia (country) in Kazakhstan
Association football forwards